Luca Oneto (born 11 November 1996) is an Italian football player. He plays for Lavagnese.

Club career
He made his Serie C debut for Santarcangelo on 27 August 2016 in a game against FeralpiSalò.

On 21 August 2019, he returned to his hometown, re-joining his local Serie D club Lavagnese.

References

External links
 

1996 births
People from Lavagna
Footballers from Liguria
Living people
Italian footballers
Association football defenders
U.S.D. Lavagnese 1919 players
Santarcangelo Calcio players
F.C. Südtirol players
Serie D players
Serie C players
Sportspeople from the Province of Genoa
20th-century Italian people
21st-century Italian people